Martin Charles Rushent (11 July 1948 – 4 June 2011) was an English record producer, best known for his work with The Human League, The Stranglers and Buzzcocks.

Early life 

Rushent was born on 11 July 1948 in Enfield, Middlesex. His father was a car salesman. Rushent attended Minchenden Grammar School in Southgate, Middlesex.

Career

Early career 
Rushent's first experience in a recording studio was at EMI House in London's Manchester Square, when his school band (of which he was the lead singer) had the opportunity to record a demo.  After leaving school, Rushent, who had already experimented with his father's 4-track recorder, worked at a chemical factory before working for his father while applying for studio jobs. After numerous rejections, Rushent was employed by Advision Studios as a 35mm film projectionist. After approximately three months, Rushent began working in the audio department as a tape operator alongside Tony Visconti. He worked on sessions for Fleetwood Mac,  T.Rex, Yes, Emerson, Lake & Palmer, Petula Clark, Jerry Lee Lewis and Osibisa.  Rushent stated that while at Advision, Jerry Lee Lewis threw a tantrum as Yes had been booked into the studio when he was not ready to leave, and chased the studio staff around the complex until they locked themselves in a different studio.

Rushent progressed to senior assistant engineer, staff engineer, and eventually head engineer. He then began working freelance, where he built his reputation and was employed by United Artists (UA).  While with UA, Rushent recorded sessions alongside Martin Davies, recording artists such as Shirley Bassey and Buzzcocks, as well as convincing the company to sign The Stranglers provided that he produced the band's material. Rushent produced the group's Rattus Norvegicus, No More Heroes and Black and White albums and recorded demos for Joy Division, before tiring of his commute to London and leaving UA at the end of the 1970s.

Synth-pop 
Rushent expressed a desire to move away from guitar bands, and bought a Linn LM-1 drum machine, Roland MC-8 Microcomposer and Jupiter-8 synthesiser to learn sequencing and synthesis techniques. Rushent set up his own studio, Genetic, designed by renowned studio designer Eddie Veale, with Synclavier and Fairlight CMI synthesisers and an MCI console.  He spent £35,000 on air conditioning alone, and had a Mitsubishi Electric digital recorder costing £75,000.

Rushent used his Roland equipment to record Pete Shelley's first solo album, Homosapien. Originally demos for the planned fourth Buzzcocks album, Shelley and Rushent deemed the recordings releasable, and Shelley was signed to Island Records. They were heard by Simon Draper of Virgin Records, who asked Rushent to produce The Human League. Rushent's work on the group's 1981 album Dare earned him a BRIT Award in 1982 for Best British producer.

Rushent's production on Dare frustrated the group's guitarist Jo Callis, as the only guitar on the album was used to trigger a gate on the synthesiser. Singer Susanne Sulley was also frustrated by the lengthy process of Rushent's synth programming. In 1983, Rushent walked out of his own studio after Sulley made an off-the-cuff comment toward him. 

Rushent also produced albums by Generation X, Altered Images and The Go-Go's in the 1980s.

Rushent decided to take a break from production in the 1990s,  and sold his assets – including Genetic Studios. He briefly took up a consultancy position with Virgin, but retired from the industry to raise his children.

Later career 
Rushent returned to the music industry in the mid-1990s when he established Gush, a dance club on Greenham Common. The club's opening night was headlined by The Prodigy with support from Mad Professor and LTJ Bukem.  Rushent soon began redeveloping his interest in recording, and
decided to catch up on the technological advances he had missed.

Rushent built a home studio around a Mackie console, Alesis ADAT HD24 recorder and Cubase 5, with which he produced music by The Pipettes, Does It Offend You, Yeah? and Killa Kela.  In 2005, he produced Hazel O'Connor's album Hidden Heart.  The following year, he was involved with the BBC Electric Proms when he recorded Enid Blitz, winners in the Brighton area, at a 15th-century manor house in Brentford, using a BBC truck as the control room.

In 2007, Rushent produced the recording Cherry Vanilla by The (Fabulous) Cult of John Harley. The recording was used by the American singer and actress Cherry Vanilla in the launch of her autobiography Lick Me: How I Became Cherry Vanilla.

At the time of his death, Rushent was working on a 30th anniversary version of Dare, remixed like Love and Dancing but using musical instruments instead of synthesisers.

Personal life 
In 1972, Rushent married Linda Trodd, with whom he had three children – daughter Joanne and sons Tim and James. They separated in the 1980s, and Rushent later married Ceri Davis, with whom he had a daughter named Amy. Rushent lived with Ceri and Amy in the Berkshire village of Upper Basildon. Rushent's son James is the lead singer of the dance-punk band Does It Offend You, Yeah?. Rushent died on 4 June 2011, at his home in Berkshire. No cause was specified.

Discography

References

External links

 
Interview/Feature (2007)
Video interview
Martin Rushent interview entitled 'Getting It On' pp28-37(2007)
Martin Rushent Obituary
Simon Fellowes ("Intaferon") Web Site

English record producers
English audio engineers
1948 births
2011 deaths
People from Enfield, London
Brit Award winners
English new wave musicians